Carlota Baró Riau (born in Barcelona on March 12, 1989) is a Spanish actress, known mainly for her appearance in the series El secreto del Puente Viejo and Amar es para siempre.

Biography 
She studied classical dance for fifteen years in different schools in Barcelona, where she was born (Ramón Soler Schools, Company and Company, Mar Estudio, and with José Manuel Rodríguez and Esmeralda Maycas) and trained as an actress with Esteve Rovira and in the school of Nancy Tuñón and Jordi Oliver.

In 2006 she worked in the spot Talla amb els mals rotllos, directed by Isabel Coixet for a campaign of the Generalitat de Catalunya against gender violence.

In 2008-2009 she worked in the theater in plays such as Romeo y Julieta, Viejos tiempos and La importancia de llamarse Ernesto.

In mid-2011, while combining theater with her studies in Art History,  she had the opportunity to debut on television with the role of Mariana Castañeda in El secreto de Puente Viejo, one of the main characters of the series, remaining for five years and participating in 1,340 episodes.

In 2015 she starred in Los vencejos no sonríen, written and directed by Carlos Silveira, alongside actor Francisco Ortiz.

In 2017 she taught a dance course for actors at the Centro de Investigación Teatral La Manada.

Between 2018 and 2020 she played Lucía García-Saavedra in the comedy Fin de engaño, directed by Darío Frías and written by Luis Sánchez-Polack.

Following the release of the third season of Las chicas del cable, her signing for the series was revealed.

Between 2021 and 2022 she played the role of Coral / Leo in the 10th season of Amar es para siempre.

Television

Theater 

 2008: Romeo y Julieta.
 2009: Viejos tiempos y La importancia de llamarse Ernesto.
 La importancia de llamarse Ernesto.
 2015: Los vencejos no sonríen.
 2018-2020: Fin de engaño.

Short films 

 2008: Caída (ESAC).

Advertising 

 2006: Talla amb els mals rotllos.

References

External links 
 

Spanish television actresses
Living people
1989 births
Actresses from Barcelona
21st-century Spanish dancers